Revenge of the Vinyl Cafe (2012) is Stuart McLean's fifth book of stories that first aired on the CBC Radio program The Vinyl Cafe.  It debuted at #1 in The Globe and Mail’s bestseller list.  It is the only book in the Vinyl Cafe series to have its own theme music, selected by CBC Radio listeners and written by Ottawa band The PepTides  
Stories included in Revenge of the Vinyl Cafe:
 "Hello Monster"
 "Annie’s Turn"
 "Macaulay’s Mountain"
 "Tour de Dave"
 "The House Next Door"
 "Summer of Stars"
 "Rhoda’s Revenge"
 "Fish Head"
 "Rosemary Honey"
 "The Haunted House of Cupcakes"
 "Midnight in the Garden of Envy"
 "The Black Beast of Margaree"
 "Curse of the Crayfish"
 "Whatever Happened to Johnny Flowers?"
 "Attack of the Treadmill"
 "Gabriel Dubois"
 "Code Yellow"
 "Le Morte d'Arthur"

See also
List of Dave and Morley stories

References

External links
Stuart McLean profile at cbc.ca(archived)
The Vinyl Cafe website
Bc Local News:McLean stakes his claim with Canadian audiences(archived)

2012 short story collections
Short story collections by Stuart McLean
Viking Press books